Hymenobacter rubidus  is a Gram-negative, short-rod-shaped and non-motile bacterium from the genus of Hymenobacter which has been isolated from soil from Seoul on Korea.

References 

rubidus
Bacteria described in 2016